John Sutcliffe (26 June 1913 – 5 October 1980) was an English footballer who represented Great Britain at the 1936 Summer Olympics. Sutcliffe played amateur football for Corinthian.

References

External links

1913 births
1980 deaths
English footballers
Corinthian F.C. players
Footballers at the 1936 Summer Olympics
Olympic footballers of Great Britain
Association football midfielders